Konstantinos "Kostas" Chalkias (born 30 May 1974) is a retired Greek footballer who played as a goalkeeper. Previously he had played for Panathinaikos, Apollon Athens, Iraklis, Portsmouth, Real Murcia, Aris, PAOK and Panachaiki.

He was also capped 32 times by the Greece national team, with whom he won Euro 2004. He also was selected at the next two European Championships and the 2010 FIFA World Cup.

Club career

Greece
Chalkias started his career in the Panathinaikos youth academy in the 1994–95 double winning team. He was transferred to feeder club Apollon Athens in 1996 as a replacement for retired Antonis Minou, signing a five-year professional contract. His solid performances helped Apollon avoid relegation from Alpha Ethniki and made him return to Panathinaikos two years later, in 1998. However, he did not get any playing time at Panathinaikos by his head coach Vasilis Daniil and in January 1999 he was re-sent to Apollon on loan for six months. After his return, he was forced to play third keeper to the legendary Jozef Wandzik and Greek legend Antonis Nikopolidis. He made a total of 25 starts over the next three years between 1998 and 2001 for Panathinaikos and was transferred for two seasons to Iraklis before good performances led to a return to Panathinaikos in the 2003–04 season. After playing second fiddle again to Nikopolidis during most of the 2003–04 season, he was allowed back into the first team after a dispute Nikopolidis had with management.

Going abroad
At the end of the 2003–04 season, Nikopolidis was let out on a free transfer to bitter rivals, Olympiakos, and a new keeper was bought, Mario Galinovic. After a fight for first team football, eventually Galinovic won out and due to overseas interest, Chalkias was shipped out to English side Portsmouth F.C. in January 2005, making his debut in the FA Cup fourth round tie away at fierce rivals Southampton. Over the next few matches Chalkias's wild tactics and inconsistency led to some poorly conceded goals, and he was soon dropped and replaced by Jamie Ashdown. With the signing of Sander Westerveld in July 2005, Chalkias fell even further down the pecking order, and in January 2006 he left Portsmouth by mutual consent, having made only five league appearances for the club. Shortly after his release from Portsmouth he joined Segunda División side Real Murcia.

Return to Greece
Chalkias was bought in the summer transfer window of 2006 by Aris Thessaloniki, who were then newly promoted to the Greek Superleague. After his transfer to Aris, Chalkias regained some of the form that he showed during his bright run in the first team for Panathinaikos and after an exceptional season, he was recalled το the national team and gained a starting spot over Antonis Nikopolidis after the latter's poor performance earlier in a Euro 2008 qualifying match against Turkey.

Chalkias left Aris in late May 2008 after his contract was due to run out and on 28 May 2008 he agreed to sign a two-year contract for rivals PAOK, thus becoming the third player to have played for the all three major clubs of Thessaloniki (Iraklis, Aris, PAOK) following Apostolos Tsourelas and Stefanos Borbokis.

In the 2009–10 season he reached the second position with PAOK and the semifinal of the Greek cup. In January 2010 he renewed his contract with PAOK for two more years. Chalkias has contributed to the qualification of PAOK the 2010–11 UEFA Champions League third qualifying round, after winning the preliminaries against AEK Athens, Olympiakos and Aris Thessaloniki F.C.

Retirement and comeback
On 22 September 2012, Chalkias announced his retirement from football.

After four years of inactivity, he returned to the football for the Greek team Panachaiki.

International career
Chalkias made his debut on 10 November 2001, in a friendly 4–2 home win against Estonia, as he replaced Antonis Nikopolidis at half time. In the summer 2004 he was part of the squad which won Euro 2004, although he was only the reserve 'keeper. Otto Rehhagel called him also for the qualification of Euro 2008. Chalkias played as the first goalkeeper for the Greece national team during most of the qualification for the World Cup 2010, after the retirement of the legendary goalkeeper Antonis Nikopolidis and he is the only goalkeeper from the Euro 2004.

In Euro 2012 Chalkias was the oldest player at the tournament at 38 years of age and one of just three players remaining from the victorious 2004 Greek squad. On 12 June 2012, he started the second group stage match against Czech Republic – at the 21st minute of the match, and having conceded two goals in 6 minutes, he was substituted with Michalis Sifakis due to injury. After Greece's lost quarterfinal to Germany on 22 June, a game which Chalkias watched from the bench, he announced his withdrawal from the national team alongside Nikos Liberopoulos.

Career statistics

Notes

Honours

Panathinaikos
Alpha Ethniki: 1995–96, 2003–04
Greek Cup: 2003–04

Panachaiki
Gamma Ethniki: 2016–17

Greece
European Championship: 2004

Individual
PAOK MVP of the Season: 2008–09

References

External links
Profile at PAOK's official website

1974 births
Living people
Footballers from Larissa
Greek footballers
Association football goalkeepers
Greece international footballers
UEFA European Championship-winning players
UEFA Euro 2004 players
2005 FIFA Confederations Cup players
2010 FIFA World Cup players
UEFA Euro 2008 players
UEFA Euro 2012 players
Apollon Smyrnis F.C. players
Portsmouth F.C. players
Panathinaikos F.C. players
Aris Thessaloniki F.C. players
Iraklis Thessaloniki F.C. players
PAOK FC players
Panachaiki F.C. players
Real Murcia players
Premier League players
Super League Greece players
Gamma Ethniki players
Segunda División players
Greek expatriate footballers
Greek expatriate sportspeople in England
Expatriate footballers in England
Greek expatriate sportspeople in Spain
Expatriate footballers in Spain